The Women's team sprint competition at the FIS Nordic World Ski Championships 2019 was held on 24 February 2019.

Results

Semifinals
The semifinals were started at 09:15. The first two teams of each semifinals and the next six best timed teams advanced to the final.

Semifinal A

Semifinal B

Final
The final was started at 11:30.

References

Women's team sprint